Notosariidae is a family of brachiopods belonging to the order Rhynchonellida.

Genera:
 Notosaria Cooper, 1959
 †Paraplicirhynchia Bitner, 1996
 †Plicirhynchia Allan, 1947
 †Protegulorhynchia Owen, 1980
 †Wekarhynchia Hiller, 2011

References

Brachiopods